"Crying Shame" is a song by American country pop artist Michael Johnson.  It was released in October 1987 as the first single from the album That's That.  The song reached #4 on the Billboard Hot Country Singles & Tracks chart.  Johnson wrote the song with Brent Maher and Don Schlitz.

Chart performance

References

1988 singles
Michael Johnson (singer) songs
Songs written by Don Schlitz
Songs written by Michael Johnson (singer)
RCA Records singles
Songs written by Brent Maher
Song recordings produced by Brent Maher
1987 songs